Jess Barker (June 4, 1912 – August 8, 2000) was an American actor who was active between the 1940s and 1970s. He was best known as the first husband of actress Susan Hayward.

Early years
Barker was born in Greenville, South Carolina.

Career 
Barker began his film career credited as Philip Barker until changing his stage name to Jess Barker in the early 1940s.

Barker's movie career was damaged because of the publicity resulting from a bitter custody dispute, but he still managed to find work as an actor on radio and films in supporting roles. Barker appeared as an art critic in Fritz Lang's Scarlet Street (1945) and the Abbott and Costello film The Time of Their Lives (1946). He also made two guest appearances on Perry Mason. In 1961 he played defendant Walter Eastman in "The Case of the Injured Innocent," and in 1965 he played Doug Hamilton in "The Case of the Murderous Mermaid."

Personal life 
Barker wed Susan Hayward on July 23, 1944. They had twin sons together during their ten-year marriage, whose custody was won by Hayward after a bitter court battle.

In 1956, Barker lost a paternity suit in Los Angeles. Judge Walter H. Odemar ruled that Barker was the father of Morgana, a daughter born to actress Yvonne Doughty.

Barker died of liver failure in 2000.

Filmography

References

External links

American male film actors
American male radio actors
Deaths from cirrhosis
Actors from Greenville, South Carolina
1912 births
2000 deaths
20th-century American male actors